William Samuel Hayman  (3 June 1903 – 7 February 1993)  was an Anglican priest: he was the Archdeacon of Lewisham from 1960 to 1972.

Hayman was educated at  Merchant Taylors' School, Northwood  and St John's College, Oxford. He was ordained in 1927  and began his career as a curate at St Matthew, Brixton. He was Priest in charge of St Mark, Wimbledon then held incumbencies in Finstall and Cheam.

References

1903 births
People educated at Merchant Taylors' School, Northwood
Alumni of St John's College, Oxford
Archdeacons of Lewisham
1993 deaths